Germano Zanarotto (? - ?) was an Italian wheelchair fencer who won four medals at the Summer Paralympics.

See also
 Italy at the 1968 Summer Paralympics
 Italy at the 1972 Summer Paralympics

References

External links
 

Date of birth missing
Date of death missing
Place of birth missing
Place of death missing
Paralympic wheelchair fencers of Italy
Paralympic gold medalists for Italy
Paralympic silver medalists for Italy
Paralympic medalists in wheelchair fencing
Wheelchair fencers at the 1968 Summer Paralympics
Wheelchair fencers at the 1972 Summer Paralympics
Medalists at the 1968 Summer Paralympics
Medalists at the 1972 Summer Paralympics